Cyclamen elegans (= Cyclamen coum subsp. elegans) is a perennial growing from a tuber, native to the Alborz Mountains in northern Iran and southeastern Azerbaijan. It is native to forest in the Alborz Mountains of northwestern Iran and extreme southeastern Azerbaijan below  elevation, where it can even be found growing in moss on the lower limbs of trees.

It is similar to Cyclamen coum, and was once considered a subspecies (Cyclamen coum subsp. elegans), but leaves and petals are longer as well as C. elegans flowering earlier in October or November.

The petals of C. elegans also have a dark blotch at the base of each petal in the flower head.

References

External links

Cyclamen Society (Cyclamen coum)
Ornamental Plants from Russia

elegans
Flora of Azerbaijan
Flora of Iran